Anindya Sen is a Professor of Economics at Indian Institute of Management Calcutta.

Sen received his B.A. degree from Presidency College, Kolkata, MA degree from the University of Calcutta, and Ph.D. from University of Southern California.

Before joining IIM Calcutta, Sen worked as a Lecturer of Economics at his alma-mater University of Calcutta, as a Professor and as Dean of Graduate Studies at Indira Gandhi Institute of Development Research, Mumbai, Jan 1992 - August 1993, August 1995 - September 1996.

At IIM Calcutta, Sen teaches several courses in Economics, including Microeconomics and Economics of Business Policy. 
 Dean (Academic) 2012-2015. As Dean (Academic) he led the team that obtained the AMBA and AACSB accreditations for IIM Calcutta
 He was the Dean of Programme Initiatives at IIM-C from 2005 to 2007.
 At various times, he has served as Chairman, FRP Committee, Professor-in-charge, Publications Division, Editor of Decision (for four years) and Chairman, Computer Services Committee.
 Director in-charge, Indian Institute of Management, Ranchi, since 7 November 2014.
 Faculty Representative to the Board of Governors, IIM Calcutta, since April 2016.
 External member, Faculty Council of Arts, Jadavpur University.
 Member, Editorial Board of Studies for Microeconomics, Sage Publications.
Prof. Sen is the recipient of the Annual Prof.Panchanan Chakraborty Memorial Award for best teacher and researcher in economics in West Bengal for the year 2005, from Bangiya Arthaniti Parishad(Bengal Economic Association). He has won various academic awards from the Government of India, an All-University Pre-Doctoral Merit Fellowship from the University of Southern California and Merit Certificates from the Office of International Students and Scholars, University of Southern California.

List of books
N.S.S. Narayana and AnindyaSen (eds.), Poverty, Environment and Economic Development: Festschrift for Kirit S. Parikh, Interline Publishers, Bangalore, 1995.
AnindyaSen (ed.), Readers in Economics: Industrial Organization, OxfordUniversity Press, New Delhi, 1996.
AnindyaSen, Microeconomics: Theory and Applications, OxfordUniversity Press, New Delhi, 1999.
SubirGokarn, AnindyaSen and Rajendra Vaidya (eds.), The Structure of Indian Industry. OUP, New Delhi, 2003.
D.N. Sengupta  andAnindyaSen: The Economics of Business Policy. OUP, New Delhi, 2004.
AnindyaSen and P.K.Sett (eds.): Managing Business in the 21st Century. OUP, New Delhi, 2005.
SudipChaudhuri and AnindyaSen, Indian Adaptation of Economics by Samuelson and Nordhaus. Tata McGraw-Hill, Mumbai, 2010.
AnindyaSen, General Editor for a cluster of books on Economics and Development in the Oxford India Short Introduction series, 2012.

Selected bibliography
 Sen, A (1998) "Industrial Organization", Oxford University Press 
 Sen, A (2000) "Microeconomics: Theory and Applications", Oxford University Press 
 Sengupta & Sen (2005) "Economics of Business Policy", Oxford University Press 
 Sen & Sett (2006) "Managing Business in the Twenty-first Century: A Handbook", Oxford University Press 
 Gokarn, Sen & Vaidya "The Structure of Indian Industry", Oxford University Press

References

External links
 Indian Institute of Management Calcutta - Faculty Information
 Indian Institute of Management Calcutta - Economics Group Faculty
 Indian Institute of Management Calcutta
 Indian Institute of Management Ranchi Director in Charge
 BANGIYA ARTHANITI PARISHAD

Academic staff of the Indian Institute of Management Calcutta
Academic staff of the Indian Institute of Management Ranchi
Living people
University of Calcutta alumni
Academic staff of the University of Calcutta
University of Southern California alumni
1955 births